The ASM library is a project of the OW2 consortium. It provides a simple API for decomposing, modifying, and recomposing binary Java classes (i.e. bytecode). The project was originally conceived and developed by Eric Bruneton. ASM is Java-centric at present, and does not currently have a backend that exposes other bytecode implementations (such as .NET bytecode, Python bytecode, etc.).

The name "ASM" is not an acronym: it is just a reference to the asm keyword of C, which allows some functions to be implemented in assembly language.

Uses
ASM provides a simple library that exposes the internal aggregate components of a given Java class through its visitor oriented API. ASM also provides, on top of this visitor API, a tree API that represents classes as object constructs. Both APIs can be used for modifying the binary bytecode, as well as generating new bytecode (via injection of new code into the existing code, or through generation of new classes altogether.) The ASM library has been used in several diverse applications, such as:
Performance and Profiling
Instrumentation calls that capture performance metrics can be injected into Java class binaries to examine memory/coverage data. (For example, injecting instrumentation at entry/exit points.)
Implementation of New Language Semantics
For example, Groovy uses ASM to generate its bytecode.  Also, Aspect-Oriented additions to the Java language have been implemented by using ASM to decompose class structures for point-cut identification, and then again when reconstituting the class by injecting aspect-related code back into the binary. (See: AspectWerkz)

Invokedynamic

Since version 3.2, ASM has added support for the new invokedynamic code, which allows method invocation relying on dynamic type checking on the latest JDK 7 binaries, thus easing support for dynamically typed languages.

Release history 
This table presents only releases with significant steps in  ObjectWeb ASM history, aside from versions that mainly fixed bugs and improved performance.

See also
Byte Code Engineering Library
Javassist

References

External links

OW2 Home - The OW2 Consortium Home Page.
AspectWerkz - The AspectWerkz Project Home Page. (One of the high-visibility projects that makes use of ASM.)
 Bytecode Visualizer - free Eclipse plugin for viewing and debugging Java bytecode which makes use of ASM library

OW2
Java APIs
Java (programming language) libraries
Software using the BSD license